Pteris (brake) is a genus of about 300 species of ferns in the subfamily Pteridoideae of the family Pteridaceae.  They are native to tropical and subtropical regions, southward to New Zealand, Australia, and South Africa, north to Japan and North America. 78 species (35 endemic) are found in China. Some species of Pteris have considerable economic and ecological value, such as Pteris multifida, Pteris ensiformis, Pteris vittata can be used for ornamental purposes; as a hyperaccumulator, Pteris multifida and Pteris vittata can be used to control soil pollution.

Many of them have linear frond segments, and some have sub-palmate division.  Like other members of the Pteridaceae, the frond margin is reflexed over the marginal sori. The outermost layer is the single layered epidermis without stomata. The cortex is differentiated into outer and inner cortical region. The vascular cylinder is an amphiphloic siphonostele.

The term "brake", used for members of this genus, is a Middle English word for "fern" from southern England. Its derivation is unclear, and is generally thought to be related to "bracken", whereby the latter word has been assumed to be a plural, as with "children", and the former word a back-formation. However it may have a separate derivation.

The Latin genus name Pteris refers to the Greek name for fern (also meaning feathery).

Selected species

Pteris aberrans Alderw.
Pteris abyssinica Hieron.
Pteris actiniopteroides Christ
Pteris adscensionis Sw.
Pteris albersii Hieron.
Pteris albertiae Arbelaez
Pteris altissima Poir.
Pteris amoena Bl.
Pteris angustata (Fée) C. Morton
Pteris angustipinna Tagawa
Pteris angustipinnula Ching & S.H.Wu
Pteris appendiculifera Alderw.
Pteris arborea L.
Pteris argyraea Moore
Pteris aspericaulis Wall. ex Hieron.
Pteris asperula J. Sm. ex Hieron.
Pteris atrovirens Willd.
Pteris auquieri Pichi-Serm.
Pteris austrosinica (Ching) Ching
Pteris bahamensis (Agardh) Fée
Pteris bakeri C. Chr.
Pteris baksaensis Ching
Pteris balansae Fourn.
Pteris bambusoides Gepp
Pteris barbigera Ching
Pteris barklyae (Baker) Mett
Pteris barombiensis Hieron.
Pteris bavazzanoi Pichi-Serm.
Pteris beecheyana Ag.
Pteris bella Tagawa
Pteris berteroana Ag.
Pteris biaurita L.
Pteris biformis Splitg.
Pteris blanchetiana Presl ex Ettingsh.
Pteris blumeana Agardh
Pteris boninensis H. Ohba
Pteris brassii C. Chr.
Pteris brevis Copel.
Pteris brooksiana Alderw.
Pteris buchananii Bak. ap. Sim.
Pteris buchtienii Rosenst.
Pteris burtonii Bak.
Pteris cadieri Christ
Pteris caesia Copel.
Pteris caiyangheensis L.L. Deng
Pteris calcarea Kurata
Pteris calocarpa (Copel.) M. Price
Pteris catoptera Kze.
Pteris chiapensis A. R. Sm.
Pteris chilensis Desv.
Pteris christensenii Kjellberg
Pteris chrysodioides (Fée) Hook.
Pteris ciliaris Eat.
Pteris clemensiae Copel.
Pteris comans Forst.
Pteris commutata Kuhn
Pteris concinna Hew.
Pteris confertinervia Ching
Pteris confusa T. G. Walker
Pteris congesta Prado
Pteris consanguinea Mett. ex Kuhn
Pteris coriacea Desv.
Pteris crassiuscula Ching & Wang
Pteris cretica L.
Pteris croesus Bory
Pteris cryptogrammoides Ching
Pteris cumingii Hieron.
Pteris dactylina Hook.
Pteris daguensis (Hieron.) Lellinger
Pteris dalhousiae Hook.
Pteris dataensis Copel.
Pteris dayakorum Bonap.
Pteris decrescens Christ
Pteris decurrens Presl
Pteris deflexa Link
Pteris deltea Ag.
Pteris deltodon Bak.
Pteris deltoidea Copel.
Pteris dentata Forsskal
Pteris denticulata Sw.
Pteris dispar Kze.
Pteris dissimilis (Fee) Chr.
Pteris dissitifolia Bak.
Pteris distans J. Sm.
Pteris droogmaniana L. Linden
Pteris edanyoi Copel.
Pteris ekmanii C. Chr.
Pteris elmeri Christ ex Copel.
Pteris elongatiloba Bonap.
Pteris endoneura M. Price
Pteris ensiformis Burm.
Pteris esquirolii Christ
Pteris excelsa Gaud.
Pteris famatinensis Sota
Pteris fauriei Hieron.
Pteris finotii Christ
Pteris flava Goldm.
Pteris formosana Bak.
Pteris fraseri Mett. ex Kuhn
Pteris friesii Hieron.
Pteris gallinopes Ching
Pteris geminata Wall.
Pteris gigantea Willd.
Pteris glaucovirens Goldm.
Pteris goeldii Christ
Pteris gongalensis T. G. Walker
Pteris grandifolia L.
Pteris grevilleana Wall. ex Agardh
Pteris griffithii Hook.
Pteris griseoviridis C. Chr.
Pteris guangdongensis Ching
Pteris guizhouensis Ching
Pteris haenkeana Presl
Pteris hamulosa Christ
Pteris hartiana Jenm.
Pteris heteroclita Desv.
Pteris heteromorpha Fée
Pteris heterophlebia Kze.
Pteris hillebrandii Copel.
Pteris hirsutissima Ching
Pteris hirtula (C. Chr.) C. Morton
Pteris hispaniolica Maxon
Pteris holttumii C. Chr.
Pteris hondurensis Jenm.
Pteris hookeriana Ag.
Pteris hossei Hieron.
Pteris hostmanniana Ettingsh.
Pteris hui Ching
Pteris humbertii C. Chr.
Pteris hunanensis C.M.Zhang
Pteris inaequalis (Fée) Jenm.
Pteris incompleta Cav.
Pteris inermis (Rosenstock) Sota
Pteris insignis Mett. ex Kuhn
Pteris intricata Wright
Pteris intromissa Christ
Pteris irregularis Kaulf.
Pteris iuzonensis Hieron.
Pteris izuensis Ching
Pteris johannis-winkleri C. Chr.
Pteris junghuhnii (Reinw.) Bak.
Pteris kawabatae Kurata
Pteris keysseri Rosenst.
Pteris khasiana (Clarke) Hieron.
Pteris kidoi Kurata
Pteris kinabaluensis C. Chr.
Pteris kingiana Endl.
Pteris kiuschiuensis Hieron.
Pteris laevis Mett.
Pteris lanceifolia Ag.
Pteris lastii C. Chr.
Pteris laurea Desv.
Pteris laurisilvicola Kurata
Pteris lechleri Mett.
Pteris lepidopoda M.Kato & K.U.Kramer
Pteris leptophylla Sw.
Pteris liboensis P.S.Wang
Pteris ligulata Gaud.
Pteris limae Brade
Pteris linearis Poir.
Pteris litoralis Rechinger
Pteris livida Mett.
Pteris loheri Copel.
Pteris longifolia L.
Pteris longipes D. Don
Pteris longipetiolulata Lellinger
Pteris longipinna Hayata
Pteris longipinnula Wall.
Pteris luederwaldtii Rosenst.
Pteris luschnathiana (Kl.) Bak.
Pteris luzonensis Hieron.
Pteris lydgatei (Bak.) Christ
Pteris macgregorii Copel.
Pteris macilenta A. Rich.
Pteris maclurei Ching
Pteris maclurioides Ching
Pteris macracantha Copel.
Pteris macrodon Bak.
Pteris macrophylla Copel.
Pteris macroptera Link
Pteris madagascarica Ag.
Pteris majestica Ching
Pteris malipoensis Ching
Pteris manniana Mett. ex Kuhn
Pteris melanocaulon Fée
Pteris melanorhachis Copel.
Pteris menglaensis Ching
Pteris mertensioides Willd.
Pteris mettenii Kuhn
Pteris micracantha Copel.
Pteris microdictyon (Fée) Hook.
Pteris microlepis Pichi-Serm.
Pteris microptera Mett. ex Kuhn
Pteris mildbraedii Hieron.
Pteris moluccana Bl.
Pteris monghaiensis Ching
Pteris montis-wilhelminae Alston
Pteris morii Masam.
Pteris mucronulata Copel.
Pteris multiaurita Ag.
Pteris multifida Poir.
Pteris muricata Hook.
Pteris muricatopedata Arbelaez
Pteris muricella Fée
Pteris mutilata L.
Pteris natiensis Tagawa
Pteris navarrensis H. Christ
Pteris nipponica Shieh
Pteris novae-caledoniae Hook.
Pteris obtusiloba Ching & S.H.Wu
Pteris occidentalisinica Ching
Pteris olivacea Ching in Ching & S. H. Wu
Pteris opaca J. Sm.
Pteris oppositipinnata Fée
Pteris orientalis Alderw.
Pteris orizabae M. Martens & Galeotti
Pteris oshimensis Hieron.
Pteris otaria Bedd.
Pteris pachysora (Copel.) M. Price
Pteris pacifica Hieron.
Pteris paleacea Roxb.
Pteris papuana Ces.
Pteris parhamii Brownlie
Pteris paucinervata Fée
Pteris paucipinnata Alston
Pteris paulistana Rosenst.
Pteris pearcei Bak.
Pteris pedicellata Copel.
Pteris pediformis M.Kato & K.U.Kramer
Pteris pellucida Presl
Pteris perrieriana C. Chr.
Pteris perrottetii Hieron.
Pteris philippinensis Fée
Pteris phuluangensis Tag. & Iwatsuki
Pteris pilosiuscula Desv.
Pteris plumbea Christ
Pteris pluricaudata Copel.
Pteris podophylla Sw.
Pteris polita Link
Pteris polyphylla (Presl) Ettingsh.
Pteris porphyrophlebia C. Chr. & Ching
Pteris praetermissa T. G. Walker
Pteris preussii Hieron.
Pteris prolifera Hieron.
Pteris propinqua J. Agardh
Pteris pseudolonchitis Bory ex Willd.
Pteris pseudopellucida Ching
Pteris pteridioides (Hook.) Ballard
Pteris puberula Ching
Pteris pulchra Schlecht. & Cham.
Pteris pungens Willd.
Pteris purdoniana Maxon
Pteris purpureorachis Copel.
Pteris quadriaurita Retz.
Pteris quinquefoliata (Copel.) Ching
Pteris quinquepartita Copel.
Pteris radicans Christ
Pteris ramosii Copel.
Pteris rangiferina Presl ex Miq.
Pteris reducta Bak.
Pteris remotifolia Bak.
Pteris reptans T.G. Walker
Pteris rigidula Copel.
Pteris rosenstockii C. Chr.
Pteris roseo-lilacina Hieron.
Pteris ryukyuensis Tagawa
Pteris satsumana Kurata
Pteris saxatilis Carse
Pteris scabra Bory ex Willd.
Pteris scabripes Wall.
Pteris schlechteri Brause
Pteris schwackeana Christ
Pteris semiadnata Phil.
Pteris semipinnata L.
Pteris sericea (Fée) Christ
Pteris setigera (Hook. ex Beddome) Nair
Pteris setuloso-costulata Hayata
Pteris shimenensis C.M.Zhang
Pteris shimianensis H.S.Kung
Pteris silvatica Alderw.
Pteris similis Kuhn
Pteris simplex Holtt.
Pteris sintenensis (Masam.) C.M.Kuo
Pteris speciosa Mett. ex Kuhn
Pteris splendens Kaulf.
Pteris splendida Ching
Pteris squamaestipes C. Chr. & Tardieu
Pteris squamipes Copel.
Pteris stenophylla Wall. ex Hook. & Grev.
Pteris stridens Ag.
Pteris striphnophylla Mickel
Pteris subindivisa Clarke
Pteris subquinata (Wall. ex Bedd.) Agardh
Pteris subsimplex Ching
Pteris sumatrana Bak.
Pteris swartziana Ag.
Pteris taiwanensis Ching
Pteris talamauana Alderw.
Pteris tapeinidiifolia H.Itô
Pteris tarandus M.Kato & K.U.Kramer
Pteris tenuissima Ching
Pteris togoensis Hieron.
Pteris torricelliana Christ
Pteris trachyrachis C. Chr.
Pteris transparens Mett.
Pteris tremula R. Br.
Pteris treubii Alderw.
Pteris tricolor Linden
Pteris tripartita Sw.
Pteris tussaci (Fée) Hook.
Pteris umbrosa R. Br.
Pteris undulatipinna Ching
Pteris usambarensis Hier.
Pteris vaupelii Hieron.
Pteris venusta Kunze
Pteris verticillata (L.) Lellinger & Proctor
Pteris vieillardii Mett.
Pteris viridissima Ching
Pteris vitiensis Bak.
Pteris vittata L.
Pteris wallichiana Agardh
Pteris wangiana Ching
Pteris warburgii Christ
Pteris werneri (Rosenstock) Holtt.
Pteris whitfordii Copel.
Pteris woodwardioides Bory ex Willd.
Pteris wulaiensis C.M.Kuo
Pteris yakuinsularis Kurata
Pteris yamatensis (Tagawa) Tagawa
Pteris zahlbruckneriana Endl.
Pteris zippelii (Miq.) M.Kato & K.U.Kramer

Cultivation and uses
Some of these ferns are popular in cultivation as houseplants.  These smaller species are often called "table ferns".

Pteris vittata (commonly known as brake fern) was discovered to have the ability to "hyperaccumulate" (absorb large amounts of) arsenic from soil.  The fern was growing at a central Florida site contaminated with large amounts of copper arsenate in the soil.  Dr. Lena Q. Ma of the University of Florida later discovered that it had hyperaccumulated considerable amounts of arsenic from the soil.  The discovery may lead to the use of Pteris vittata as a potential bioremediation plant.

References

Germplasm Resources Information Network: Pteris
Flora of North America: Pteris
Flora of India Pteris species list

 
Fern genera